Barnoti is a town and a newly created naib tehsil in Kathua district in the union territory of Jammu and Kashmir, India. It is situated on the NH 1A, 13 km from District Headquarter.

Geography
Barnoti has an area of 363 square kilometers.

Demographics 
According to 2011 census India census, Barnoti (Town) had a population of 106,169. Males constituted 55,924 of the population and females 50,245 with 21,202 household.

Climate
The climate of Barnoti is sub tropical, generally experiences extreme rainfall being on windward side of Siwaliks. According to common Hindu belief there are six seasons experienced in the region. Because of its proximity to rivers climate is moderate in summers and harsh in winters. Summers are hot and the mercury may shoot up to 41 degrees while in winters mercury generally dips to 2 degrees or even sometimes to zero.  Heavy downpour is also experienced.  The annual rainfall is 700 cm mainly in monsoons and winters due to Western Disturbances.  Kathua city does not experience snow while there may be snow in upper reaches of district like Bani Tehsil.  Heavy hailstorms with piles of hail can be experienced in February and March but are very few.
 in the wettest months.

See also
 Akhnoor
 Hiranagar
 Jammu
 Jammu Cantonment
 Jammu tavi
 Nagrota
 Samba, Jammu
 Talab Tillo

References 

Cities and towns in Kathua district